Dewantara United Football Club (simply known as DUFC or Dewantara United) is an Indonesian football club based in Dewantara, North Aceh Regency, Aceh. They currently compete in the Liga 3 and their homeground is PT. Pupuk Iskandar Muda Stadium.

Honours
 Langsa City Independence Cup
 Champion: 2015

References

External links
Dewantara United Instagram

North Aceh Regency
Football clubs in Indonesia
 Football clubs in Aceh
Association football clubs established in 2010
2010 establishments in Indonesia